Dr. Pavel Aleksandrovich Solovyov (Soloviev) (June 26, 1917 – October 13, 1996) was a Soviet engineer born in Alekino in Kineshemsky District of Ivanovo Oblast. He specialised in the design of aircraft engines.

Following the evacuation of the Rybinsk Aviation Institute in 1940, he went to work in Perm, where in 1953 he was made the head of his own design bureau - OKB-19 (now part of Aviadvigatel).

His many awards and decorations included the Lenin Prize (1978), the USSR State Prize (1968), the title Hero of Socialist Labor (1966), four Orders of Lenin, the Order of the October Revolution, the Order of the Red Banner, the Order of the Red Star and the Medal "For Labour Valour". He was made deputy of the Supreme Soviet of the USSR three times. A street in Perm was named after him, a monument to him was built in Rybinsk.

He died in Perm.

References

External links
Biography (in Russian)

1917 births
1996 deaths
People from Ivanovo Oblast
Soviet mechanical engineers
Heroes of Socialist Labour
Lenin Prize winners
Recipients of the USSR State Prize
Recipients of the Order of Lenin
Recipients of the Order of the Red Banner
Soviet inventors
Corresponding Members of the USSR Academy of Sciences
Corresponding Members of the Russian Academy of Sciences